The Postman Didn't Ring is a 1942 American comedy film directed by Harold D. Schuster and written by Mortimer Braus. The film stars Richard Travis, Brenda Joyce, Spencer Charters, Stanley Andrews, William Bakewell and Emma Dunn. The film was released on July 3, 1942, by 20th Century Fox.

Plot
An old mail bag is discovered whilst cleaning out an attic containing letters postmarked 1889. Postal Inspector Brennon (Stanley Andrews) vows that he will hand-deliver the letters to the addressees or their descendants, and his decision has profound effects on a number of lives.

Cast   
Richard Travis as Daniel Carter
Brenda Joyce as Julie Martin
Spencer Charters as Judge Ben Holt
Stanley Andrews as Postal Insp. Brennan
William Bakewell as Robert Harwood Jr.
Emma Dunn as Martha Carter
Joseph Cawthorn as Silas Harwood
Oscar O'Shea as Judge Barrington
Erville Alderson as Robert Harwood Sr.
Jeff Corey as Harwood Green
Frank M. Thomas as Prosecutor
Will Wright as Mr. Slade
Betty Jean Hainey as Marjorie
Ethel Griffies as Catherine Vandewater
Henry Roquemore as Jason Peters
Mary Servoss as Helen Allen

References

External links 
 

1942 films
1940s English-language films
20th Century Fox films
American comedy films
1942 comedy films
Films directed by Harold D. Schuster
Films scored by Leigh Harline
Films scored by David Raksin
American black-and-white films
1940s American films